Malaprabha Jadhav is an Indian Kurash wrestler and a Judo Player. In 2018 Asian Games, at Jakarta in 52 kg she won a bronze medal.

References

Living people
Kurash practitioners at the 2018 Asian Games
Asian Games medalists in kurash
Asian Games bronze medalists for India
Medalists at the 2018 Asian Games
21st-century Indian women
21st-century Indian people
1998 births